James G. Ward (born December 7, 1942) was an American politician in the state of Florida.

Ward was born Pensacola, Florida and is a businessman. He served in the Florida House of Representatives for the 6th district from November 2, 1976, to November 2, 1982, and the 5th district from November 2, 1982, to November 4, 1986, as a Democrat.

References

Living people
1942 births
Democratic Party members of the Florida House of Representatives
People from Pensacola, Florida